Serghei Stroenco (22 February 1967 – 24 December 2013) was a Moldovan professional footballer and manager. Serghei Stroenco has played a record number of 445 games in Moldovan National Division. He died in Vladimirovca at the age of 46 on 24 December 2013.

International career
Stroenco has made 46 appearances for the Moldova national football team.

Honours

As player
Tiligul Tiraspol
Divizia Națională
Runner-up (6): 1992, 1992-93, 1993-94, 1994-95, 1995-96, 1997-98
Moldovan Cup (3): 1992–93, 1993–94, 1994-95
Runner-up (2): 1992, 1995-96

As coach
Zimbru Chișinău
Divizia Națională
Third place (1): 2011-12
Moldovan Cup
Quarter finals (1): 2011-12

Other facts
Serghei Stroenco was one of the 11 Moldovan football players challenged and beaten by Tony Hawks and features in his book Playing the Moldovans at Tennis.

References

External links
 
 Profile at KLISF
 
 IN MEMORIAM Serghei Stroenco (Foto/Video) at zimbru.md
 In Memoriam Serghei Stroenco RIP (22.02.67 - 24.12.13). Media-set at Facebook

1967 births
2013 deaths
Soviet footballers
Moldovan footballers
Moldova international footballers
Moldovan Super Liga players
FC Zimbru Chișinău players
CS Tiligul-Tiras Tiraspol players
FC Zimbru Chișinău managers
Association football defenders
Moldovan football managers
Moldovan Super Liga managers